Rough consensus is a term used in consensus decision-making to indicate the "sense of the group" concerning a particular matter under consideration.  It has been defined as the "dominant view" of a group as determined by its chairperson.  The term was first used by the Internet Engineering Task Force (IETF) in describing its procedures for working groups (WGs).   The means to establish rough consensus was described by the IETF as follows:
Working groups make decisions through a "rough consensus" process.  IETF consensus does not require that all participants agree although this is, of course, preferred.  In general, the dominant view of the working group shall prevail.  (However, "dominance" is not to be determined on the basis of volume or persistence, but rather a more general sense of agreement). Consensus can be determined by a show of hands, humming, or any other means on which the WG agrees (by rough consensus, of course).  Note that 51% of the working group does not qualify as "rough consensus" and 99% is better than rough.  It is up to the Chair to determine if rough consensus has been reached (IETF Working Group Guidelines and Procedures).

The phrase is often extended into the saying "rough consensus and running code", to make it clear that the IETF is interested in practical, working systems that can be quickly implemented.  There is some debate as to whether running code leads to rough consensus or vice versa. There is also caution about whether percentages are a good measure for rough consensus.  The IETF published a subsequent document pointing out that supporting percentage is less important for determining "rough consensus" than ensuring opposing views are addressed.

References

Working groups
Consensus